Circles in a Square Society is the sixth album by the jazz/world music trio Boi Akih, released in 2012.

After extensive listening sessions with classic rock records and lengthy discussions about songs with a timeless quality, Brouer and Akihary decided to incorporate some of their favorite selections into an album that includes a musical commentary on the era from which the songs came.

Reception
The album was met with a great deal of positive critical reception in Europe and the music was showcased live at Bimhuis, and on World Radio6. Saskia Törnqvist gave the album a 4 star out of 5 rating in the Parool. Dutch Newspaper De Volkskrant published a 5 star rating by Frank van Herk.

Track listing
" Circle 5" (N. Brouwer, M. Akihary)
" Guinnevere" (D. Crosby)
" Cold Blue Steel And Sweet Fire" (J. Mitchell)
" Circle 2" (N. Bouwer)
" A Merman I Should Turn To Be" (J. Hendrix)
" Drifting" (J. Hendrix)
" Circle 3" (N. Brouwer, W. Wierbos)
" Old Man (song)"
" Circle Exercise" (N. Brouwer)
" Circle 4" (N. Brouwer)
" Redemption Song" (B. Marley)

Personnel
Monica Akihary – vocals
Niels Brouwer – guitar, computer, no-input mixer, world band receiver
Wolter Wierbos – trombone
Kim Weemhoff – drums

References

External links
Performing the new album at Bimhuis -

2012 albums